Eastern Air Lines Flight 212 was a controlled flight into terrain accident of a McDonnell Douglas DC-9 during approach to Charlotte Douglas International Airport in North Carolina. The incident occurred on September 11, 1974, killing 72 of the 82 people on board. The scheduled flight was from Charleston Municipal Airport to Chicago O'Hare, with an intermediate stop in Charlotte.

An investigation by the National Transportation Safety Board (NTSB) determined that multiple crew errors were the primary cause of the crash.

Accident
On the morning of September 11, 1974, while conducting an instrument approach in dense ground fog into Douglas Municipal Airport in Charlotte, the aircraft crashed at 7:34 am EDT more than  short of Runway 36, killing 72 of the 82 on board. Thirteen survived the initial impact, including the first officer and one flight attendant, but three of the initial survivors ultimately died from severe burn injuries as late as 29 days after the accident.
Among the fatalities was the vice president for academic affairs of the Medical University of South Carolina, James William Colbert Jr., and two of his sons; they were the father and brothers of future television personality Stephen Colbert.

Aircraft and crew 

The aircraft was a five-year-old McDonnell Douglas DC-9-31 registered as N8984E, which was delivered to Eastern Airlines on January 30, 1969. The captain was 49-year-old James E. Reeves, who had been with the airline since 1956. He had 8,876 flight hours, including 3,856 hours on the DC-9. The first officer was 36-year-old James M. Daniels Jr. He had been with the airline since 1966 and had 3,016 flight hours, including 2,693 hours on the DC-9.

Crash investigation and recommendations
While investigating this accident, the National Transportation Safety Board (NTSB) reviewed the cockpit voice recorder (CVR) and found that the flight crew had engaged in unnecessary and "nonpertinent" conversation during the approach phase of the flight, discussing subjects "ranging from politics to used cars." The NTSB concluded that conducting such nonessential chatter can distract pilots from their flying duties during the critical phases of flight, such as instrument approach to landing, and recommended that the Federal Aviation Administration (FAA) establish rules and educate pilots to focus exclusively on flying tasks while operating at low altitudes. It was later realized that this rule should also apply to takeoffs; for example, the lack of a sterile cockpit environment was a contributing factor to the crash of Air Florida Flight 90 on January 13, 1982. The FAA, after more than six years of consideration, finally published the sterile cockpit rule in 1981.

The NTSB also found that the crew was apparently trying to visually locate the airport while executing an instrument approach in the presence of low-lying fog. The first officer was operating the flight controls, and none of the required altitude callouts were made by the captain, which compounded the flight crew's nearly total lack of altitude awareness.

During the investigation, the issue of the flammability of passengers' clothing materials was raised. There was evidence that passengers who wore double-knit synthetic fiber clothing articles sustained significantly worse burn injuries during the post-crash fire than passengers who wore articles made from natural fibers.

The NTSB released its final report on May 23, 1975, concluding that the accident was caused by the flight crew's lack of altitude awareness and poor cockpit discipline. The NTSB issued the following official probable cause:

Jimmy Carr joke 
British comedian Jimmy Carr, noted for his dark humour, tweeted about the incident on the tenth anniversary of the September 11 attacks as an act of misdirection, causing significant controversy:Sept 11th Date of terrible air disaster. When Eastern Airlines Flt 212 crashed in 1974. Killing 69. No one will forget that in a hurry.

See also

 2000 Marsa Brega Short 360 crash – a similar crash in Libya in which the pilot discussed another plane system instead of focusing on the flight
 Aviation safety
 Controlled flight into terrain
 Eastern Air Lines Flight 401, another Eastern Airlines CFIT accident caused by pilot distraction
 Ground proximity warning system
 List of accidents and incidents involving commercial aircraft
 Avianca Flight 410
 September 11 Attacks

References

External links
Photo of aircraft N8984E taken in Miami, FL, on Feb. 1974, before the accident (Archive)

Airliner accidents and incidents caused by pilot error
Airliner accidents and incidents in North Carolina
Aviation accidents and incidents in the United States in 1974
1974 in North Carolina
212
Disasters in North Carolina
Accidents and incidents involving the McDonnell Douglas DC-9
History of Charlotte, North Carolina
September 1974 events in the United States
Charlotte Douglas International Airport
Stephen Colbert
Aviation accidents and incidents involving controlled flight into terrain